Constitution Day or Jeheonjeol (hanja: 制憲節) in South Korea is observed on 17 July, the day that the South Korean constitution was proclaimed in 1948. The date was deliberately chosen to match the founding date of 17 July of the Joseon dynasty.

Background
Although the Korean Peninsula was liberated from Imperial Japanese rule by the Allies at the end of World War II on 15 August 1945, it was caught in the middle of a Cold War power struggle between the Soviet Union and the United States. It took until 1948 for a democratic election for National Assembly members to be held in South Korea. The elected assembly members set upon creating a constitution, and decided upon a presidential and unicameral system. The constitution was formally adopted on 12 July 1948 and promulgated by South Korean President Syngman Rhee on 17 July 1948.

History
Constitution Day was proclaimed to be a South Korean national holiday on 1 October 1949, with the creation of the National Holiday Law.

Since 2008, Constitution Day in South Korea is no longer a "no work" public holiday, following the restructure of laws regarding the public sector with a 40-hour work week. It is still a national holiday for commemoration.

Activities
On Constitution Day in South Korea, a commemorative ceremony is held with the President, Chairman of the National Assembly, Chief Justice of the Supreme Court and the original constitutional assembly members in attendance, and citizens hang the national flag in commemoration. Special activities such as marathons are often held.

See also
 Public holidays in South Korea

References

External links
 Musical score for the song played on Constitution Day

South Korean culture
Observances in South Korea
July observances
Korea, South
Summer events in South Korea